Mime Gopi is an Indian stage and film actor who has appeared in predominantly Tamil films including Madras (2014), Kathakali (2016), and Kabali (2016).

Career
Mime Gopi already acted in Saravanan Meenatchi season 1 along with Mirchi Saravanan as money launderer. Prior to his entrance into the film industry, Gopi was a renowned mime actor in Chennai and headed G Mime Studio, a studio which exhibited the art form. In his role, he worked closely with children with special needs to help them adapt miming skills. The actor celebrates every birthday and festivals by doing charity work across Tamil Nadu. He also had contributed money to the local festivals of the religious organisations. He is an inspiration to the upcoming theatre actors. He had set up the studio in 1994 and had worked to expand the art across Chennai. Mime Gopi shot to fame with director Pa. Ranjith's Madras (2014) and he gave notable performances  in Maari (2015), Maya and Kabali (2016). He has been working in Bairavaa (2017) with Vijay. Gopi has stated that his biggest regret in life as a growing actor is that he wasn't able to act in Seyal (2018). The actor disclosed that though he was approached earlier for the role of a villain, he couldn't accept the offer as he was shooting for another film. But now after seeing the film in a private screening the actor feels like he has really missed out on a fantastic role.

Filmography

Tamil films

Telugu films

Malayalam films

Television

References

Living people
Male actors in Tamil cinema
Male actors in Telugu cinema
Male actors in Malayalam cinema
21st-century Indian male actors
1973 births